Anna Zwirydowska (born January 28, 1986) is a Polish freestyle wrestler. She won a bronze medal at the 2008 FILA Wrestling World Championships in the category -55 kg. She committed an anti-doping rule violation during in-competition doping control at the 2008 Women’s World Championships in Tokyo, Japan. As a result, Zwirydowska was disqualified and removed from the classification standings.

References 
 Wrestler profile on official 2008 FILA World Championships website 

1986 births
Living people
Polish female sport wrestlers
World Wrestling Championships medalists
Place of birth missing (living people)
European Wrestling Championships medalists
21st-century Polish women